was a Japanese domain of the Edo period. It was associated with Buzen Province in modern-day Ōita Prefecture on the island of Kyushu.   The domain was centered at Nakatsu Castle in what is now Nakatsu, Ōita.

In the han system, Nakatsu was a political and economic abstraction based on periodic cadastral surveys and projected agricultural yields.  In other words, the domain was defined in terms of kokudaka, not land area. This was different from the feudalism of the West.

List of daimyōs 
The hereditary daimyōs were head of the clan and head of the domain.

  Hosokawa clan, 1600–1632 (tozama; 399,000 koku)

Tadaoki
(Hosokawa Tadatoshi

  Ogasawara clan, 1632–1716 (Fudai; 80,000→40,000 koku)

Nagatsugu
Nagakatsu
Nagatane
Naganobu
Nagasato

Okudaira clan, 1717–1872 (fudai; 100,000 koku)

Masashige
Masaatsu
Masaka
Masao
Masataka
Masanobu
Masamichi
Masamoto
Masayuki

See also 
 List of Han
 Abolition of the han system
 Fukuzawa Yukichi

References

External links

 Nakatsu on "Edo 300 HTML" (9 Oct. 2007)

Domains of Japan
Ogasawara clan
Okudaira clan
Ōshū-Hosokawa clan